Eight Immortals (Baat Sin Diy Hoi Siu Yiu Moh) is a 1971 Taiwanese fantasy film directed by Chan Hung Man. The film tells the story of the Eight Immortals, an octet of warriors in Chinese mythology.

External links 
 Eight Immortals at Hong Kong Cinemagic
 
 

1971 films
1970s fantasy films
Taiwanese fantasy films